Judit Stugner (born 22 January 1942) is a Hungarian athlete. She competed in the women's discus throw at the 1964 Summer Olympics and the 1968 Summer Olympics.

References

1942 births
Living people
Athletes (track and field) at the 1964 Summer Olympics
Athletes (track and field) at the 1968 Summer Olympics
Hungarian female discus throwers
Olympic athletes of Hungary
Place of birth missing (living people)
Universiade silver medalists for Hungary
Universiade medalists in athletics (track and field)
Medalists at the 1965 Summer Universiade